Mamba's Daughters is a 1929 novel written by DuBose Heyward and published by the University of South Carolina Press. It was later adapted by Heward and his wife Dorothy Heyward for the stage; the play premiered on Broadway in 1939.

Novel
The book is set in the early 20th century, following three different families in scenes of deception and social transformation. The book also explores racial boundaries during that period of the 20th century. It received positive reviews, with the Georgia Historical Quarterly commenting that it provided "a unique perspective not only of Charleston's racial tensions, but also of the unique subculture shared by Charleston's elite whites and poorer blacks".  

Mamba's Daughters was translated into French (1932) and Dutch (1939).

Stage adaptation
The novel was adapted for the stage by Heyward and his wife Dorothy Heyward, with songs by Jerome Kern; it premiered on Broadway at the Empire Theatre on January 3, 1939, starring Ethel Waters, for whom the Heywards wrote the adaptation, and directed by Guthrie McClintic. It initially ran for 162 performances, closing on May 20, 1939, and then returned the following year, to the Broadway Theatre, running for 17 performances, from March 23, 1940, to April 6, 1940.

Notably, Waters became the first African American, male or female, to star in a television show, The Ethel Waters Show, which was broadcast on NBC on June 14, 1939, and included a dramatic sequence from the play, along with two actresses from the stage production, Georgette Harvey and Fredi Washington.

Perry Watkins, designing the scenery, was the first African-American to design a Broadway show. He then, in 1942, worked in scenic designing on the Herbert  B. Ehrmann play Under this Roof.

Original cast
Ethel Waters – Hagar
Anne Brown – Gardenia
Willie Bryant – Gilley Bluton
Georgia Burke – Eva
Helen Dowdy – Willie May
José Ferrer – St. Julien DeC. Wentworth
Georgette Harvey – Mamba (Hagar's mother)
Alberta Hunter – Dolly
J. Rosamond Johnson – The Reverend Quintus Whaley
Canada Lee – Drayton
Harry Mestayer – The Judge
Fredi Washington – Lissa
Jimmy Wright – Tony

References

External links
 Productions at the Internet Broadway database

1929 American novels
Novels set in South Carolina